The 1988–89 ACB season was the 6th season of the Liga ACB, after changing its name. The number of teams increased from 16 to 24. The format also changed. The 24 teams were divided into two groups of 12. After playing a league, 24 teams were divided into three groups of eight teams each. The first six of the white group and the champions of the red and blue groups played for the title.

FC Barcelona won their third ACB title, and their 6th overall. It was their third ACB title in a row.

Team Standings

First stage

Group A-1

Group A-2

Second stage

Group I

Group II

Group III

Playoffs

Relegation Playoffs

Caja Guipúzcoa and Valvi Girona were relegated.

Qualification Games
(I-1) Clesa Ferrol vs. (II-3) Pamesa Valencia
Clesa Ferrol win the series 3-0 and qualified to play in the A-1 the next season 
Game 1 May 6, 1989 @ Ferrol: Clesa Ferrol 100 - Pamesa Valencia 76
Game 2 May 8, 1989 @ Ferrol: Clesa Ferrol 111 - Pamesa Valencia 107
Game 3 May 11, 1989 @ Valencia: Pamesa Valencia 79 - Clesa Ferrol - 83

(I-2) Magia de Huesca vs. (III-3) BBV Villalba
 BBV Villalba win the series 3-2 and qualified to play in the A-1 the next season  
Game 1 May 6, 1989 @ Huesca: Magia de Huesca 67 - BBV Villalba 66
Game 2 May 8, 1989 @ Huesca: Magia de Huesca 66 - BBV Villalba 73
Game 3 May 11, 1989 @ Collado Villalba: BBV Villalba 82 - Magia de Huesca 53
Game 4 May 13, 1989 @ Collado Villalba: BBV Villalba 70 - Magia de Huesca 88
Game 5 May 16, 1989 @ Huesca: Magia de Huesca 67 - BBV Villaba 78

(III-1) Estudiantes Bose vs. (II-2) Mayoral Maristas
Estudiantes Bose win the series 3-0 and qualified to play in the A-1 the next season
Game 1 May 6, 1989 @ Madrid: Estudiantes Bose 102 - Mayoral Maristas 80
Game 2 May 8, 1989 @ Madrid: Estudiantes Bose 87 - Mayoral Maristas 82
Game 3 May 11, 1989 @ Málaga: Mayoral Maristas 80 - Estudiantes Bose 91

(II-1) Cajabilbao vs. (III-2) Puleva Baloncesto Granada
 Cajabilbao win the series 3-2 and qualified to play in the A-1 the next season
Game 1 May 6, 1989 @ Bilbao: Cajabilbao 94 - Puleva Baloncesto Granada 87
Game 2 May 8, 1989 @ Bilbao: Cajabilbao 69 - Puleva Baloncesto Granada 79
Game 3 May 11, 1989 @ Granada: Puleva Baloncesto Granada 79 - Cajabilbao 83
Game 4 May 13, 1989 @ Granada: Puleva Baloncesto Granada 83 - Cajabilbao 79
Game 5 May 16, 1989 @ Bilbao: Cajabilbao 70 - Puleva Baloncesto Granada 69

Championship Playoffs

External links
 ACB.com 
 linguasport.com 

Liga ACB seasons
Spain